Roland Kökény (born 24 October 1975) is a Hungarian sprint canoer who competed from the early 2000s in European and World Championships as well as the Olympic Games.

Biography
Born in Miskolc, Kökény won four medals at the ICF Canoe Sprint World Championships with two golds (K-2 1000 m: 2005, K-4 1000 m: 2006) and two silvers (K-4 1000 m: 2001, 2003).

Kökény also competed in three Summer Olympics, at the London Olympics of 2012, he won the gold medal together with Rudolf Dombi for his country in the Kayak Double (K2) 1000m.  At the 2004 Summer Olympics in Athens he came sixth in the K-1 1000 m event.

Awards
   Cross of Merit of the Republic of Hungary – Bronze Cross (2004)
 Hungarian kayaker of the Year (2): 2005, 2012
   Order of Merit of Hungary – Officer's Cross (2012)
 Honorary Citizen of Esztergom (2012)
 Perpetual champion of Hungarian Kayak-Canoe (2012)
 Member of the Hungarian team of year (Men's K-2 with Rudolf Dombi): 2012
 Honorary Citizen of Zugló (2012)

References

External links
 
 

1975 births
Budapest Honvéd FC canoers
Canoeists at the 2000 Summer Olympics
Canoeists at the 2004 Summer Olympics
Canoeists at the 2012 Summer Olympics
Hungarian male canoeists
Living people
Olympic canoeists of Hungary
Olympic gold medalists for Hungary
Olympic medalists in canoeing
ICF Canoe Sprint World Championships medalists in kayak
Medalists at the 2012 Summer Olympics
Sportspeople from Miskolc